Graduate Studies in Mathematics (GSM) is a series of graduate-level textbooks in mathematics published by the American Mathematical Society (AMS).  The books in this series are published in hardcover and e-book formats.

List of books

1	The General Topology of Dynamical Systems, Ethan Akin (1993)
2	Combinatorial Rigidity, Jack Graver, Brigitte Servatius, Herman Servatius (1993)
3	An Introduction to Gröbner Bases, William W. Adams, Philippe Loustaunau (1994)
4	The Integrals of Lebesgue, Denjoy, Perron, and Henstock, Russell A. Gordon (1994)
5	Algebraic Curves and Riemann Surfaces, Rick Miranda (1995)
6	Lectures on Quantum Groups, Jens Carsten Jantzen (1996)
7	Algebraic Number Fields, Gerald J. Janusz (1996, 2nd ed.)
8	Discovering Modern Set Theory. I: The Basics, Winfried Just, Martin Weese (1996)
9	An Invitation to Arithmetic Geometry, Dino Lorenzini (1996)
10	Representations of Finite and Compact Groups, Barry Simon (1996)
11	Enveloping Algebras, Jacques Dixmier (1996)
12	Lectures on Elliptic and Parabolic Equations in Hölder Spaces, N. V. Krylov (1996)
13	The Ergodic Theory of Discrete Sample Paths, Paul C. Shields (1996)
14	Analysis, Elliott H. Lieb, Michael Loss (2001, 2nd ed.)
15	Fundamentals of the Theory of Operator Algebras. Volume I: Elementary Theory, Richard V. Kadison, John R. Ringrose (1997)
16	Fundamentals of the Theory of Operator Algebras. Volume II: Advanced Theory, Richard V. Kadison, John R. Ringrose (1997)
17	Topics in Classical Automorphic Forms, Henryk Iwaniec (1997)
18	Discovering Modern Set Theory. II: Set-Theoretic Tools for Every Mathematician, Winfried Just, Martin Weese (1997)
19	Partial Differential Equations, Lawrence C. Evans (2010, 2nd ed.)
20	4-Manifolds and Kirby Calculus, Robert E. Gompf, András I. Stipsicz (1999)
21	A Course in Operator Theory, John B. Conway (2000)
22	Growth of Algebras and Gelfand-Kirillov Dimension, Günter R. Krause, Thomas H. Lenagan (2000, Revised ed.)
23	Foliations I, Alberto Candel, Lawrence Conlon (2000)
24	Number Theory: Algebraic Numbers and Functions, Helmut Koch (2000)
25	Dirac Operators in Riemannian Geometry, Thomas Friedrich (2000)
26	An Introduction to Symplectic Geometry, Rolf Berndt (2001)
27	A Course in Differential Geometry, Thierry Aubin (2001)
28	Notes on Seiberg-Witten Theory, Liviu I. Nicolaescu (2000)
29	Fourier Analysis, Javier Duoandikoetxea (2001)
30	Noncommutative Noetherian Rings, J. C. McConnell, J. C. Robson (1987); 2001 pbk reprint with corrections
31	Option Pricing and Portfolio Optimization: Modern Methods of Financial Mathematics, Ralf Korn, Elke Korn (2001)
32	A Modern Theory of Integration, Robert G. Bartle (2001)
33	A Course in Metric Geometry, Dmitri Burago, Yuri Burago, Sergei Ivanov (2001)
34	Differential Geometry, Lie Groups, and Symmetric Spaces, Sigurdur Helgason (2001)
35	Lecture Notes in Algebraic Topology, James F. Davis, Paul Kirk (2001)
36	Principles of Functional Analysis, Martin Schechter (2002, 2nd ed.)
37	Theta Constants, Riemann Surfaces and the Modular Group: An Introduction with Applications to Uniformization Theorems, Partition Identities and Combinatorial Number Theory, Hershel M. Farkas, Irwin Kra (2001)
38	Stochastic Analysis on Manifolds, Elton P. Hsu (2002)
39	Classical Groups and Geometric Algebra, Larry C. Grove (2002)
40	Function Theory of One Complex Variable, Robert E. Greene, Steven G. Krantz (2006, 3rd ed.)
41	Introduction to the Theory of Differential Inclusions, Georgi V. Smirnov (2002)
42	Introduction to Quantum Groups and Crystal Bases, Jin Hong, Seok-Jin Kang (2002)
43	Introduction to the Theory of Random Processes, N. V. Krylov (2002)
44	Pick Interpolation and Hilbert Function Spaces, Jim Agler, John E. McCarthy (2002)
45	An Introduction to Measure and Integration, Inder K. Rana (2002, 2nd ed.)
46	Several Complex Variables with Connections to Algebraic Geometry and Lie Groups, Joseph L. Taylor (2002)
47	Classical and Quantum Computation, A. Yu. Kitaev, A. H. Shen, M. N. Vyalyi (2002)
48	Introduction to the h-Principle, Y. Eliashberg, N. Mishachev (2002)
49	Secondary Cohomology Operations, John R. Harper (2002)
50	An Invitation to Operator Theory, Y. A. Abramovich, C. D. Aliprantis (2002)
51	Problems in Operator Theory, Y. A. Abramovich, C. D. Aliprantis (2002)
52	Global Analysis: Differential Forms in Analysis, Geometry and Physics, Ilka Agricola, Thomas Friedrich (2002)
53	Spectral Methods of Automorphic Forms, Henryk Iwaniec (2002, 2nd ed.)
54	A Course in Convexity, Alexander Barvinok (2002)
55	A Scrapbook of Complex Curve Theory, C. Herbert Clemens (2003, 2nd ed.)
56	A Course in Algebra, E. B. Vinberg (2003)
57	Concise Numerical Mathematics, Robert Plato (2003)
58	Topics in Optimal Transportation, Cédric Villani (2003)
59	Representation Theory of Finite Groups: Algebra and Arithmetic, Steven H. Weintraub (2003)
60	Foliations II, Alberto Candel, Lawrence Conlon (2003)
61	Cartan for Beginners: Differential Geometry via Moving Frames and Exterior Differential Systems, Thomas A. Ivey, J. M. Landsberg (2003)
62	A Companion to Analysis: A Second First and First Second Course in Analysis, T. W. Körner (2004)
63	Resolution of Singularities, Steven Dale Cutkosky (2004)
64	Lectures on the Orbit Method, A. A. Kirillov (2004)
65	Global Calculus, S. Ramanan (2005)
66	Functional Analysis: An Introduction, Yuli Eidelman, Vitali Milman, Antonis Tsolomitis (2004)
67	Introduction to Quadratic Forms over Fields, T.Y. Lam (2005)
68	A Geometric Approach to Free Boundary Problems, Luis Caffarelli, Sandro Salsa (2005)
69	Curves and Surfaces, Sebastián Montiel, Antonio Ros (2009, 2nd ed.)
70	Probability Theory in Finance: A Mathematical Guide to the Black-Scholes Formula, Seán Dineen (2013, 2nd ed.)
71	Modern Geometric Structures and Fields, S. P. Novikov, I. A. Taimanov (2006)
72	Introduction to the Mathematics of Finance, Ruth J. Williams (2006)
73	Graduate Algebra: Commutative View, Louis Halle Rowen (2006)
74	Elements of Combinatorial and Differential Topology, V. V. Prasolov (2006)
75	Applied Asymptotic Analysis, Peter D. Miller (2006)
76	Measure Theory and Integration, Michael E. Taylor (2006)
77	Hamilton's Ricci Flow, Bennett Chow, Peng Lu, Lei Ni (2006)
78	Linear Algebra in Action, Harry Dym (2013, 2nd ed.)
79	 Modular Forms, a Computational Approach, William A. Stein (2007)
80	Probability, Davar Khoshnevisan (2007)
81	Elements of Homology Theory, V. V. Prasolov (2007)
82	Pseudo-differential Operators and the Nash-Moser Theorem, Serge Alinhac, Patrick Gérard (2007)
83	Functions of Several Complex Variables and Their Singularities, Wolfgang Ebeling (2007)
84	Cones and Duality, Charalambos D. Aliprantis, Rabee Tourky (2007)
85	Recurrence and Topology, John M. Alongi, Gail S. Nelson (2007)
86	Lectures on Analytic Differential Equations, Yulij Ilyashenko, Sergei Yakovenko (2008)
87	Twenty-Four Hours of Local Cohomology, Srikanth B. Iyengar, Graham J. Leuschke, Anton Leykin, Claudia Miller, Ezra Miller, Anurag K. Singh, Uli Walther (2007)
88	C∗-Algebras and Finite-Dimensional Approximations, Nathanial P. Brown, Narutaka Ozawa (2008)
89	A Course on the Web Graph, Anthony Bonato (2008)
90	Basic Quadratic Forms, Larry J. Gerstein (2008)
91	Graduate Algebra: Noncommutative View, Louis Halle Rowen (2008)
92	Finite Group Theory, I. Martin Isaacs (2008)
93	Topics in Differential Geometry, Peter W. Michor (2008)
94	Representations of Semisimple Lie Algebras in the BGG Category O, James E. Humphreys (2008)
95	Quantum Mechanics for Mathematicians, Leon A. Takhtajan (2008)
96	Lectures on Elliptic and Parabolic Equations in Sobolev Spaces, N. V. Krylov (2008)
97	Complex Made Simple, David C. Ullrich (2008)
98	Discrete Differential Geometry: Integrable Structure, Alexander I. Bobenko, Yuri B. Suris (2008)
99	Mathematical Methods in Quantum Mechanics: With Applications to Schrödinger Operators, Gerald Teschl (2009)
100	Algebra: A Graduate Course, I. Martin Isaacs (1994)
101	A Course in Approximation Theory, Ward Cheney, Will Light (2000)
102	Introduction to Fourier Analysis and Wavelets, Mark A. Pinsky (2002)
103	Configurations of Points and Lines, Branko Grünbaum (2009)
104	Algebra: Chapter 0, Paolo Aluffi (2009)
105	A First Course in Sobolev Spaces, Giovanni Leoni (2009)
106	Embeddings in Manifolds, Robert J. Daverman, Gerard A. Venema (2009)
107	Manifolds and Differential Geometry, Jeffrey M. Lee (2009)
108	Mapping Degree Theory, Enrique Outerelo, Jesús M. Ruiz (2009)
109	Training Manual on Transport and Fluids, John C. Neu (2010)
110	Differential Algebraic Topology: From Stratifolds to Exotic Spheres, Matthias Kreck (2010)
111	Ricci Flow and the Sphere Theorem, Simon Brendle (2010)
112	Optimal Control of Partial Differential Equations: Theory, Methods and Applications, Fredi Troltzsch (2010)
113	Continuous Time Markov Processes: An Introduction, Thomas M. Liggett (2010)
114	Advanced Modern Algebra, Joseph J. Rotman (2010, 2nd ed.)
115	An Introductory Course on Mathematical Game Theory, Julio González-Díaz, Ignacio García-Jurado, M. Gloria Fiestras-Janeiro (2010)
116	Linear Functional Analysis, Joan Cerdà (2010)
117	An Epsilon of Room, I: Real Analysis: pages from year three of a mathematical blog, Terence Tao (2010)
118	Dynamical Systems and Population Persistence, Hal L. Smith, Horst R. Thieme (2011)
119	Mathematical Statistics: Asymptotic Minimax Theory, Alexander Korostelev, Olga Korosteleva (2011)
120	A Basic Course in Partial Differential Equations, Qing Han (2011)
121	A Course in Minimal Surfaces, Tobias Holck Colding, William P. Minicozzi II (2011)
122	Algebraic Groups and Differential Galois Theory, Teresa Crespo, Zbigniew Hajto (2011)
123	Lectures on Linear Partial Differential Equations, Gregory Eskin (2011)
124	Toric Varieties, David A. Cox, John B. Little, Henry K. Schenck (2011)
125	Riemann Surfaces by Way of Complex Analytic Geometry, Dror Varolin (2011)
126	An Introduction to Measure Theory, Terence Tao (2011)
127	Modern Classical Homotopy Theory, Jeffrey Strom (2011)
128	Tensors: Geometry and Applications, J. M. Landsberg (2012)
129	Classical Methods in Ordinary Differential Equations: With Applications to Boundary Value Problems, Stuart P. Hastings, J. Bryce McLeod (2012)
130	Gröbner Bases in Commutative Algebra, Viviana Ene, Jürgen Herzog (2011)
131	Lie Superalgebras and Enveloping Algebras, Ian M. Musson (2012)
132	Topics in Random Matrix Theory, Terence Tao (2012)
133	Hyperbolic Partial Differential Equations and Geometric Optics, Jeffrey Rauch (2012)
134	Analytic Number Theory: Exploring the Anatomy of Integers, Jean-Marie De Koninck, Florian Luca (2012)
135	Linear and Quasi-linear Evolution Equations in Hilbert Spaces, Pascal Cherrier, Albert Milani (2012)
136	Regularity of Free Boundaries in Obstacle-Type Problems, Arshak Petrosyan, Henrik Shahgholian, Nina Uraltseva (2012)
137	Ordinary Differential Equations: Qualitative Theory, Luis Barreira, Clàudia Valls (2012)
138	Semiclassical Analysis, Maciej Zworski (2012)
139	Knowing the Odds: An Introduction to Probability, John B. Walsh (2012)
140	Ordinary Differential Equations and Dynamical Systems, Gerald Teschl (2012)
141	A Course in Abstract Analysis, John B. Conway (2012)
142	Higher Order Fourier Analysis, Terence Tao (2012)
143	Lecture Notes on Functional Analysis: With Applications to Linear Partial Differential Equations, Alberto Bressan (2013)
144	Dualities and Representations of Lie Superalgebras, Shun-Jen Cheng, Weiqiang Wang (2012)
145	The K-book: An Introduction to Algebraic K-theory, Charles A. Weibel (2013)
146	Combinatorial Game Theory, Aaron N. Siegel (2013)
147	Matrix Theory, Xingzhi Zhan (2013)
148	Introduction to Smooth Ergodic Theory, Luis Barreira, Yakov Pesin (2013)
149	Mathematics of Probability, Daniel W. Stroock (2013)
150	The Joys of Haar Measure, Joe Diestel, Angela Spalsbury (2013)
151    Introduction to 3-Manifolds, Jennifer Schultens (2014)
152    An Introduction to Extremal Kähler Metrics, Gábor Székelyhidi (2014)
153    Hilbert's Fifth Problem and Related Topics, Terence Tao (2014)
154    A Course in Complex Analysis and Riemann Surfaces, Wilhelm Schlag (2014)
155    An Introduction to the Representation Theory of Groups, Emmanuel Kowalski (2014)
156    Functional Analysis: An Elementary Introduction, Markus Haase (2014)
157    Mathematical Methods in Quantum Mechanics: With Applications to Schrödinger Operators, Gerald Teschl (2014, 2nd ed.)
158    Dynamical Systems and Linear Algebra, Fritz Colonius, Wolfgang Kliemann (2014)
159    The Role of Nonassociative Algebra in Projective Geometry, John R. Faulkner (2014)
160    A Course in Analytic Number Theory, Marius Overholt (2014)
161    Introduction to Tropical Geometry, Diane Maclagan, Bernd Sturmfels (2015)
162    A Course on Large Deviations with an Introduction to Gibbs Measures, Firas Rassoul-Agha, Timo Seppäläinen (2015)
163    Introduction to Analytic and Probabilistic Number Theory, Gérald Tenenbaum (2015, 3rd ed.)
164    Expansion in Finite Simple Groups of Lie Type, Terence Tao (2015)
165    Advanced Modern Algebra, Part 1, Joseph J. Rotman (2015, 3rd ed.)
166    Problems in Real and Functional Analysis, Alberto Torchinsky (2015)
167    Singular Perturbation in the Physical Sciences, John C. Neu (2015)
168    Random Operators: Disorder Effects on Quantum Spectra and Dynamics, Michael Aizenman, Simone Warzel (2015)
169    Partial Differential Equations: An Accessible Route through Theory and Applications, András Vasy (2015)
170    Colored Operads, Donald Yau (2016)
171    Nonlinear Elliptic Equations of the Second Order, Qing Han (2016)
172    Combinatorics and Random Matrix Theory, Jinho Baik, Percy Deift, Toufic Suidan (2016)
173    Differentiable Dynamical Systems: An Introduction to Structural Stability and Hyperbolicity, Lan Wen (2016)
174    Quiver Representations and Quiver Varieties, Alexander Kirillov Jr. (2016)
175    Cartan for Beginners: Differential Geometry via Moving Frames and Exterior Differential Systems, Thomas A. Ivey, Joseph M. Landsberg (2016, 2nd ed.)
176    Ordered Groups and Topology, Adam Clay, Dale Rolfsen (2016)
177    Differential Galois Theory through Riemann-Hilbert Correspondence: An Elementary Introduction, Jacques Sauloy (2016)
178    From Frenet to Cartan: The Method of Moving Frames, Jeanne N. Clelland (2017)
179    Modular Forms: A Classical Approach, Henri Cohen, Fredrik Strömberg (2017)
180    Advanced Modern Algebra, Part 2, Joseph J. Rotman (2017, 3rd ed.)
181    A First Course in Sobolev Spaces, Giovanni Leoni (2017, 2nd ed.)
182    Nonlinear PDEs: A Dynamical Systems Approach, Guido Schneider, Hannes Uecker (2017)
183    Separable Algebras, Timothy J. Ford (2017)
184    An Introduction to Quiver Representations, Harm Derksen, Jerzy Weyman (2017)
185    Braid Foliations in Low-Dimensional Topology, Douglas J. LaFountain, William W. Menasco (2017)
186    Rational Points on Varieties, Bjorn Poonen (2017)
187    Introduction to Global Analysis: Minimal Surfaces in Riemannian Manifolds, John Douglas Moore (2017)
188    Introduction to Algebraic Geometry, Steven Dale Cutkosky (2018)
189    Characters of Solvable Groups, I. Martin Isaacs (2018)
190    Lectures  on Finite Fields, Xiang-dong Hou (2018)
191    Functional Analysis, Theo Bühler, Dietmar A. Salamon (2018)
192    Lectures on Navier-Stokes Equations, Tai-Peng Tsai (2018)
193    A Tour of Representation Theory, Martin Lorenz (2018)
194    Algebraic Statistics, Seth Sullivant (2018)
195    Combinatorial Reciprocity Theorems:An Invitation to Enumerative Geometric Combinatorics, Matthias Beck, Raman Sanyal (2018)
196    Convection-Diffusion Problems:An Introduction to Their Analysis and Numerical Solution, Martin Stynes, David Stynes (2018)
197    A Course on Partial Differential Equations, Walter Craig (2018)
198    Dynamics in One Non-Archimedean Variable, Robert L Benedetto (2019)
199    Applied Stochastic Analysis, Weinan E, Tiejun Li, Eric Vanden-Eijnden (2019)
200    Mathematical Theory of Scattering Resonances, Semyon Dyatlov, Maciej Zworski (2019)
201    Geometric Relativity, Dan A Lee (2019)
202    Introduction to Complex Analysis, Michael E Taylor (2019)
203    The Distribution of Prime Numbers, Dimitris Koukoulopoulos (2019)
204    Hochschild Cohomology for Algebras, Sarah J. Witherspoon (2019)
205    Invitation to Partial Differential Equations, Maxim Braverman, Robert McOwen, Peter Topalov, Mikhail Shubin (2020)
 206   Extrinsic Geometric Flows, Ben Andrews, Bennett Chow, Christine Guenther, Mat Langford (2020)
 207   Organized Collapse: An Introduction to Discrete Morse Theory, Dmitry N. Kozlov (2020)
 208   Geometry and Topology of Manifolds: Surfaces and Beyond, Vicente Muñoz, Ángel González-Prieto, Juan Ángel Rojo (2020)
 209   Hyperbolic Knot Theory, Jessica Purcell (2020)
 210   Combinatorics: The Art of Counting, Bruce E. Sagan (2020)
 211   Invitation to Nonlinear Algebra, Bernd Sturmfels (2021)
 212   Differential Equations: A Dynamical Systems Approach to Theory and Practice, Marcelo Viana, José M. Espinar (2021)
 213   Hamilton–Jacobi Equations: Theory and Applications, Hung Vinh Tran (2021)
 214   Portfolio Theory and Arbitrage: A Course in Mathematical Finance, Ioannis Karatzas, Constantinos Kardaras (2021)
 215   Shock Waves, Tai-Ping Liu (2021)
 216   A Concise Introduction to Algebraic Varieties, Brian Osserman (2021)
 217   Lectures on Poisson Geometry, Marius Crainic, Rui Loja Fernandes, Ioan Mărcuț (2021)
 218   Lectures on Differential Topology, Riccardo Benedetti (2021)
 219   Essentials of Tropical Combinatorics, Michael Joswig (2021)
 220   Ultrafilters Throughout Mathematics, Isaac Goldbring (2022)
 221   One-Dimensional Ergodic Schrödinger Operators: I. General Theory, David Damanik, Jake Fillman (2022)
 222   Algebraic Geometry: Notes on a Course, Michael Artin (2022)
 223   Groups and Topological Dynamics, Volodymyr Nekrashevych (2022)
 224   Discrete Analogues in Harmonic Analysis: Bourgain, Stein, and Beyond, Ben Krause (2022)
 225   The Mathematical Analysis of the Incompressible Euler and Navier-Stokes Equations: An Introduction, Jacob Bedrossian, Vlad Vicol (2022)
 226   A First Course in Spectral Theory, Milivoje Lukić (2022)
 227   Geometric Structures on Manifolds, William M. Goldman (2022)
 228   Topological and Ergodic Theory of Symbolic Dynamics, Henk Bruin (2022)
 229   A First Course in Fractional Sobolev Spaces, Giovanni Leoni (2023)

See also
Graduate Texts in Mathematics

Notes

External links
 Graduate Studies in Mathematics on AMS Bookstore

Series of mathematics books
Mathematics-related lists